The Thirtieth Legislature of Albania, officially known as the IX Pluralist Legislature of Albania, is the legislature of Albania following the 2017 general election of Members of Parliament (MPs) to the Albanian Parliament. The party of the Prime Minister Edi Rama, PS, obtained an absolute majority of 74 deputies, alongside its ally, the Social Democratic Party (PSD), which secured 1 seat and Party for Justice, Integration and Unity (PDIU) 3 seats.

Composition of the Parliament

Election of chairperson

Procedure for election of the Chairperson of the Parliament

The procedure for the election of the Chairperson is foreseen by the Article 6 of Parliament's Rules which states that:

 A candidate for Chairperson of the Parliament shall be nominated by at least 15 deputies. An MP can not support more than one candidate. The proposal should be made with writing, contains the relevant signatures and is submitted to the Provisional Secretariat of Parliament.
 The Chairperson of the Parliament shall be elected without debate and by secret ballot, by majority vote, in the presence of more than half of all members of the Parliament. If none of the candidates has won the required majority, it is followed by a second round, where they vote for the two candidates that have received the most votes.
 Voting is publicly organized and chaired by a 5-member Voting Committee that reflects, as far as possible, the political composition of the Parliament. The oldest member by age also exercises the function of the Chairperson the Voting Committee and announce the voting results.
 The Speaker of the session immediately invites the elected Chairperson of the Parliament to take his place.

Critics and pre-election process

On September 9, 2017, which was the inauguration day of the IX Legislature of the Albanian Parliament, began the morning with the oath of the 140 new deputies elected in the general elections of June 25, 2017.

On the afternoon of the same day, a second session was called for the election of the new Chairperson of the Parliament of Albania.

Only the Socialist Party, which was the winner of the elections, made a proposal for the post of the Chairman of parliament. The PS proposed Mr. Gramoz Ruçi, who is one of the long-standing MPs in the pluralist Albanian parliamentary history. His candidacy received prior consensus from PDIU and the PSD parties.

While the biggest opposition party PD opposed Ruçi's as candidature as chairman with the claim that he was a Sigurimi employee and Minister of Internal Affairs at the end of the communist dictatorship.

The  Democratic Party along with ex-politically persecuted people who protested outside the parliament the election of Mr. Ruçi's as Chairman of the Parliament, by linking him with the murder of 4 protesters killed by the police in Shkodër on 2 April 1991, time Mr. Ruçi was Minister of Internal Affairs.

Voting Session

The voting session in parliament was chaired by the oldest parliamentary deputy of parliament, who was Mr. Besnik Bare. There were 121 deputies in the session, since the 19 deputies of the Socialist Movement for Integration were absent, due to the objections they had with the proposal by the Socialist Party. Mr. Ruci was elected Chairman of the Parliament with 80 votes in favor and 40 votes against.

Parliamentary groups

Deputies can form parliamentary groups according to party affiliation or political orientation. Within 3 days from the date of election of the Chairperson of the Parliament, each MP declares, in writing, membership in a parliamentary group. Deputies elected during the legislature make the declaration within 3 days of the oath. A minimum of 7 MPs is required for the creation of a parliamentary group. Every MP may only be a member of a parliamentary group. A member leaving the parliamentary group may join another parliamentary group only after six months from the date of leaving from the actual parliamentary group. Each parliamentary group, at its first meeting, chooses its leadership.

Parliamentary Group of the Socialist Party

The parliamentary group of the Socialist Party of Albania is chaired by Mr. Taulant Balla, who replaces in this position Mr. Gramoz Ruci, who was the leader of this parliamentary group in the previous legislature of the Parliament. The Socialist Party's parliamentary group consists with a total of 74 deputies, emerged from the June 2017 elections; thus obtaining the absolute majority in the Parliament of Albania.

Parliamentary Group of the Democratic Party

The parliamentary group of the Democratic Party of Albania consists of 33 deputies, emerged from the June 2017 elections. It is the second largest group in the Albanian Parliament and is chaired by Mr. Edmond Spaho who replaces the former leader of the group for previous legislature, Mr. Edi Paloka. Despite the fact that the Democratic Party won 43 deputies in the general elections of June 2017, they are not included DP parliamentary group because some of them are leaders of the ally parties (such as PR; PDK; PBDNJ etc.) of the DP; based on a political agreement made between the allied parties before the elections, they decide to be represented in a single list to increase the chances of winning in some constituencies.

Parliamentary Group of the Socialist Movement for Integration

The parliamentary group of the Socialist Movement for Integration consists of 19 deputies elected in the June 2017 general elections, in which LSI was represented solely by challenging the two traditional parties, such as the Democratic Party; and its former ally in the previous legislature, the Socialist Party. The group is chaired by Mr. Petrit Vasili, who is also the deputy chairman of LSI.

Parliamentary Group of the Republican Party
The Republican Party was not represented in the June 2017 elections under its own name, but some of its candidacies were included in the PD list on the basis of a pre-election political agreement between the allied parties in the opposition, which was then submitted to the Central Election Commission.
However, after the constitution of the parliament, the Republican Party created its own parliamentary group consisting of 7 deputies. The group is chaired by Mr. Fatmir Mediu, who is also the chairman of the party.

MPs not included in Parliamentary Groups

There are 7 deputies who are not involved in any of the parliamentary groups formed after the parliament constitution. Three of them belong to the Party for Justice, Integration and Unity, which failed to obtain the quorum needed (7 MPs) to form its own group. One MP belong to Social Democratic Party, Mr. Tom Doshi.

There are also three leaders of allied parties of the Democratic Party who were elected from its list in the June 2017 elections, but who decided not included themselves in the DP Parliamentary Group. They are: Dashamir Shehi chairman of the Movement for National Development (LZHK); Nard Ndoka chairman of the Demochristian Party (PDK); Vangjel Dule chairman of the Unity for Human Rights Party (PBDNJ).

Bureau of the Parliament

The Parliament Bureau pursues and decides the administrative issues and the interior functioning of the Parliament and of its bodies. The Bureau of Parliament is composed by the Chairperson of the Parliament, the Deputy Chairpersons, two secretaries on the budget and four secretaries. The bureau its led by the Chairperson.
The composition of the Bureau of Parliament must reflect, as much as possible, the political composition of the Parliament. It cannot be elected more than one secretary on budget or secretary from the same parliamentary group. One Deputy Chairperson must belong to the biggest opposition party.

The Chairperson of Parliament consults with the leaders of the parliamentary groups about the composition of the Bureau. The composition of the Parliament Bureau is agreed upon with consensus in the meeting of the Chairperson with the parliamentary groups' leaders. The Chairperson proposes to vote it at the plenary sitting, which takes the decision with open voting.

The Bureau decides on the budget of the Parliament based on the proposals of the secretaries on the budget; decides on the complaints in the cases of the constitution of the parliamentary groups and the complaints of the parliamentary groups on the composition of the standing committees of the Parliament.

The Bureau of Parliament, with the proposal of the Secretary General, approves the Internal Regulation on Organization and Functioning of Parliament Services. The Bureau of Parliament issues the orders and regulations regarding:

 the organization of the services in the Parliament and the assigned tasks to all its sections in compliance with the functioning of the Parliament.
 the legal status, the economic treatment and conditions of services to all the Parliament's employees.

The Bureau examines and decides about the disciplinary measures proposed by the Chairperson of the Parliament according to the Article 65/2 of the Parliament Rule. The Bureau of Parliament, with the proposal of the Chairperson of Parliament, appoints the Secretary General of Parliament on the basis of three candidatures from the competition procedures according to the law on civil service. It can approves the annual report of the Parliament's activity prepared by the Secretary General and decides on its publication.

Composition of the Parliament 

The Constitution of Albania mandates that the Parliament consists of not less than 140 members, elected by a direct elected secret ballot for four-year terms. The electoral system is closed list proportional representation. There are 12 multi-member constituencies corresponding to the 12 administrative regions of the country. Parliamentary elections are held within 60 days to 30 days before the end of the mandate and not later than 45 days after dissolution.

As specified by the current electoral legislation in Albania, 140 members of the Parliament are elected in multi-seat constituencies. Within any constituency, parties must meet a threshold of 3 percent of votes, and pre-election coalitions must meet a threshold of 5 percent of votes.

31st Parliament  

The two largest political parties in Albania are the Socialist Party (PS) and the Democratic Party (PD). The last elections were held on 25 June 2017. Following is a list of political parties with representation in the Parliament by the 2017 Albanian parliamentary election:

Post-February 2019 parliamentary composition
During the political crisis, opposition parties announced that all their MP's in the Parliament would resign from the parliament on 22 February, more than 40 seats were vacated and the Central Elections Commission started in the following days the procedures to replace the MP's with mostly unknown and inexperienced figures that were part of the candidate lists during the 2017 election.

After weeks of filling the vacancies, in the end the parliament had this composition.

List of MPs elected in the general election 

The following is a list of 140 members elected to the parliament in the 2017 general election. It consists of the representative's name, party, and they are divided according to the 12 constituencies of Albania to which they belong, in addition to noting members assigned to government, resigned or deceased, with their parliamentary functions, chair and deputy chairs of standing committees and parliamentary leaders of the parties.

Thirteen representatives are members of Rama II Cabinet and a fourteenth its elected as Chairperson of the Parliament. MP's can exercise the function of the minister and at the same time hold the post of deputy.

See also 

Parliament of Albania
2017 Albanian parliamentary election

Note

References 

Legislatures of Albania